Paddy Ryan (1851–1900) was an Irish-American boxer and world heavyweight champion.

Paddy Ryan may also refer to:

 Paddy Ryan (actor) (1911–1990), British TV and film stuntman
 Paddy Ryan (hurler) (1912–1991), Irish hurler
 Patrick Ryan (athlete) (1881–1964), Irish-American hammer thrower
 Paddy Ryan (rugby union, born 1988), Australian rugby union player
 Paddy Ryan (rugby union, born 1990), Irish-American rugby union player
 Earl Patrick Freeman (1932–1989), Canadian professional wrestler, best known by the ring name Paddy Ryan
 Patrick Joseph Ryan (1904–1969), Australian Catholic priest, nicknamed "Paddy"